The 2020–21 season was the 114th season in the existence of Venezia F.C. and the club's fourth consecutive season in Serie B, the second division of Italian football. In addition to the domestic league, Venezia participated in this season's edition of the Coppa Italia.

Players

First-team squad

 (Captain)

Out on loan

Transfers

In

Out

Pre-season and friendlies

Competitions

Overall record

Serie B

League table

Results summary

Results by round

Matches
The league fixtures were announced on 9 September 2020.

Promotion play-offs

Coppa Italia

References

Venezia F.C. seasons
Venezia